The 2016 National Women's League was the fourteenth season of the NWL since its establishment in 2002. Seven teams were involved this season, after being in the competition the last few seasons as preparation for the FIFA U-17 Women's World Cup, the NZ Development Squad wasn't included in the league anymore.

2016 National Women's League

Teams
Unlike its male counterpart, the ISPS Handa Premiership, the teams are run by the regional federations rather than as collaborative entities between local clubs.

Table

Matches
Matches for the 2016 season took place between October and November 2016

Round 1

Bye: Southern United

Round 2

Bye: WaiBOP

Round 3

Bye: Canterbury United Pride

Round 4

Bye: Central

Round 5

Bye: Northern

Round 6

Bye: Auckland

Round 7

Bye: Capital

Finals series
For the final series, the team that finishes second will play off at home against the team that finishes third, while the team that finishes first has the week off before playing the winner of 2nd v 3rd.

Preliminary Final

Final

Top goalscorers

References

External links
Official website

2016
football
Women
Women